Ansgar Eugène Olaussen (27 December 1887 – 22 January 1962) was a Norwegian newspaper editor, educated as a typographer, and politician. As a politician he started in Young Communist League of Norway (and notably edited Klassekampen from 1911 to 1921. For the Labour Party he was county leader, central board member and MP for slightly more than a year, until he joined the Communist Party in 1923. Some years after finishing his sole term as an MP for the Communists, he shifted to the far right and associated himself with Nazism during the Second World War.

Career in the labour movement
He was born in Tønsberg as a son of Hannibal Olaussen (1848–1916) and Bella Sophie Johansen (1852–1918). His father was an immigrant from Tanum, Sweden, and was a bookbinder by profession, like Eugène's older sister Anna Catharina. The family later lived in Moss. Eugène Olaussen later settled in Hokksund.

He started his working career at the age of 13, and after some years as a laborer he learned the typographer's trade. His apprenticeship was spent in newspapers like Moss Avis and Jarlsberg. From 1911 to 1921 he edited the publication of NSU, Klassekampen. He recruited Nikolay Bukharin and Karl Radek to write in the newspaper, and gained a personal acquaintance with Vladimir Lenin.

In the summer of 1913 he applied unsuccessfully for the editor chair in Demokraten.

In 1918 he was a part of the left wing that assumed power in the Norwegian Labour Party. He became a member of the party's central board. In 1921 NSU changed name to the Young Communist League of Norway, as the social democrats broke out of the Labour Party. In 1923 the communists broke out of the Labour Party to form the Communist Party, and the Young Communist League followed. He remained central board member here until 1924. His central board membership in the Labour Party was ended in 1923 as he joined the Communist Party, so did his time as county leader in the Labour Party since 1920. His party change came in mid-term since being elected to the Parliament of Norway in 1921.

Also in 1923 he wrote the propagandistic history book  together with Arvid G. Hansen and Aksel Zachariassen. From 1924 to 1925 he edited the communist magazine Proletaren. He was fired for opposing a semi-union with the Labour Party (some two months after the editor of Arbeidet was fired for supporting such a union). He was also imprisoned for 120 days for antimilitaristic agitation. He also translated French poetry and published  and the novel  in 1926.

Shift to the far right
Olaussen had already undergone change from antimilitarism to favoring a violent revolution, when he in 1927 shifted from the extreme left to the far right. He left the Communist Party in 1927, but unlike many others who then joined the Labour Party, he joined the right-wing Fatherland League in 1928 and later the Conservative Party. From 1927 he wrote for the newspaper Tidens Tegn. During the occupation of Norway by Nazi Germany he was refused membership in the fascist party Nasjonal Samling. Nonetheless, he wrote extensively for the Nazi publications of the party.

Post-war
Olaussen wrote the memoirs , "From Kremlin to Youngstorget". The memoirs were printed, but because of the war's end, his kind was not longer tolerated and the book was not published. In 1947, Olaussen, during the legal purge in Norway after World War II, was sentenced for Nazi collaboration to two and a half-years in prison. He died in January 1962.

References

1887 births
1962 deaths
Norwegian people of Swedish descent
Norwegian newspaper editors
Norwegian magazine editors
Norwegian prisoners and detainees
Members of the Storting
Buskerud politicians
Labour Party (Norway) politicians
Communist Party of Norway politicians
Fatherland League (Norway)
People convicted of treason for Nazi Germany against Norway
Norwegian memoirists
20th-century Norwegian novelists
20th-century memoirists
Politicians from Tønsberg